Marc Broussard (born January 14, 1982) is an American singer-songwriter. His style is best described as "Bayou Soul", a mix of funk, blues, R&B, rock and pop, matched with distinct Southern roots. He has released eight studio albums, one live album, three EPs, and has charted twice on Hot Adult Top 40 Tracks.

Early life
Marc Broussard is the son of Ted Broussard, an acclaimed Louisiana Hall of Fame guitarist and former member of The Boogie Kings. Marc was raised in Carencro, Louisiana and Lafayette, Louisiana.

Musical career
In 2001 Broussard was part of Y, a Christian band based out of New Iberia, Louisiana.

Broussard's solo career started with the release of several independent efforts, including 2002's Momentary Setback which spawned "The Wanderer", a song about self-discovery. A re-worked version of the song appears on his first major album Carencro (Island Records), released on August 3, 2004. The album's title pays tribute to the musician's hometown of Carencro, Louisiana, where he still resides. It featured the two singles "Where You Are" (which garnered some considerable airplay on VH1) and "Home".

In 2007, he released S.O.S.: Save Our Soul, an album consisting almost entirely of cover songs. The album was his first to reach the top 100 of the Billboard 200 in the US, debuting and peaking at No. 96: this had the effect of "graduating" him from the Top Heatseekers chart, which consists of albums by artists who have never reached the top 100.

Broussard finished recording the Must Be The Water EP on the Rock Boat VII in January 2008 and released it later that year. He was no stranger to the Rock Boat, an annual ocean liner cruise and music festival. This was Broussard's first release with his new label, Atlantic Records, with which he signed a multi-album contract in 2007.

Broussard has been a featured performer on many TV programs including The Tonight Show with Jay Leno, A&E Breakfast with the Arts, Jimmy Kimmel Live!, Late Night with Conan O'Brien, CBS Saturday Early Show, Larry King Live, Lopez Tonight, and CBS's Saturday Morning's Second Cup Cafe. His music has been featured on shows such as Clash of the Choirs in which "Home" was performed by a Blake Shelton-led choir. Singer Kelly Clarkson performed "Home" as part of her live setlist in 2006 and 2007. His song "Must Be the Water" was the theme song for the 2008 NBA All-Star Game.

In 2008, Broussard released his next studio album, Keep Coming Back. The song "Hard Knocks" from this album was featured in the last episode of the 2009 season of the HBO series Hard Knocks which features the Cincinnati Bengals football team.

Broussard's fourth full-length album, Marc Broussard was released on June 14, 2011. An early EP release, Marc Broussard EP, was released on March 22, 2011, and features the singles "Lucky" and "Only Everything". A third single, "Cruel", followed later that year. In late 2012, he signed a deal with Vanguard Records.

On November 6, 2015, he released independently a Christmas album, Magnolias and Mistletoe, which was preceded by the single "Almost Christmas".

In March 2016, he announced a new studio album which would serve as a sequel to his '70s-influenced S.O.S.: Save Our Soul cover album. Its first single "Cry to Me" premiered in May. The following year, he released his next studio album Easy to Love on September 15, 2017. In September 2018, he premiered a music video for the song "Memory of You".

Personal life
Broussard married his wife, Sonya, on The Rock Boat VIII in January 2008. They have four children.

Philanthropy and public service
Broussard is involved in philanthropic work. He founded the Momentary Setback Fund to benefit victims of Hurricane Katrina and Hurricane Rita. He released an album Bootleg to Benefit the Victims of Hurricane Katrina in 2005, with all proceeds going to help rebuild Broussard's home state, Louisiana. He is also involved in the United Way and Habitat for Humanity. In 2007, Broussard was involved in an Entertain the Troops tour in the Middle East.

Discography

Studio albums

Live albums

Extended plays

Singles

Other album appearances
Sail Away: The Songs of Randy Newman (2006) (Song: "You Can Leave Your Hat On")
Lemonade (G. Love) (2006) (Song: "Let the Music Play" with Ben Harper)
Goin' Home: A Tribute to Fats Domino (2007) (Song: "Rising Sun" with Sam Bush)
Family (LeAnn Rimes) (2007) (Song: "Nothing Wrong")
Under Summer Sun (Matt Wertz) (2008) (Song: "The Way I Feel")
Everything She Was (Josh Hoge) (2008) (Song: "Take It Or Leave It")
Light of Day: A Tribute to Bruce Springsteen (Various Artists) (2008) (Song: "Back in Your Arms")
Serve2 (Fighting Hunger & Poverty) (2008) (Song: "Bring It On Home To Me")
Dark Streets – Original Motion Picture Soundtrack (2008) (Song: "When You Lose Somebody")
Christmas Gumbo (Various Artists) (2008) (Song: "On Santa's Way Home")
Backatown (Trombone Shorty) (2010) (Song: "Right to Complain")
Home by the River (Drew Young) (2011) (Song: "Home by the River" "Changing Lanes and Holding Hands")
LIVE (Scott Alan) (2012) (Song: "In This Moment")
Öpfelboum u Palme (Special Edition) (Ritschi) (2015) (Song: "Nume 5 Minute")
Home (Pat Green) (2015) (Song: "'Good Night in New Orleans' ")
I Wanna Sing Right: Rediscovering Lomax in the Evangeline Country (Various Artists) (2015) (Song: "When I Die")
Overture (Daniel and Laura Curtis) (2016) (Song: "What Happened to Yesterday?")
Christmas Soul (Various Artists) (2017) (Song: "Please Come Home For Christmas")
Father Figures – Soundtrack (2017) (Song: "Tell Me the Truth" with Lord Netty)
 A Jazz Celebration of The Allman Brothers Band (2019) (Songs: "Statesboro Blues" and "Whipping Post")

References

External links

Internet Archive: Audio Archive: Live Music Archive: Marc Broussard

Living people
1982 births
American male singer-songwriters
American rock singers
American rock songwriters
Atlantic Records artists
Singer-songwriters from Louisiana
21st-century American male singers
21st-century American singers
21st-century American guitarists
American soul singers
American male pop singers